Anna Sprung (born 16 May 1975) is a Russian biathlete. She competed in the women's sprint event at the 1998 Winter Olympics. After the winter Olympics, she competed for Austria.

References

External links
 

1975 births
Living people
Biathletes at the 1998 Winter Olympics
Russian female biathletes
Olympic biathletes of Russia
Place of birth missing (living people)